Kim Jae-ho  (Hangul:김재호, Hanja: 金宰鎬) (born March 21, 1985) is a South Korean infielder who plays for the Doosan Bears in the KBO League. Kim graduated from Choong Ang High School and joined the Doosan Bears through the first draft in 2004. His main position is shortstop, however, he sometimes plays as a second baseman. He won the KBO League Golden Glove Award in 2015 and 2016 consecutively.

He handed over his captain's position to Kim Jae-hwan when he was dismissed due to an injury in 2017, and returned to his batting sense, but was dismissed again on August 29, 2017 after being hit by Kim Jae-hwan while defending against the Lotte Giants.

Career

References

External links
Career statistics and player information at Korea Baseball Organization

1985 births
Living people
Baseball players from Seoul
South Korean baseball players
Doosan Bears players
KBO League shortstops
2015 WBSC Premier12 players
2017 World Baseball Classic players